Alexandre 'Alex' Jeannin (born 30 December 1977 in Troyes, France) is a French footballer,  who plays for Weymouth.

Football career
Jeannin began his career at local club Troyes, where he mainly played for the reserves in the fifth tier of French football. He made two first team appearances in Ligue 2 during the 1997-98 season. He then moved to Racing Club Paris where he played in the Championnat National

He started playing in England in the 2000-01 season when Darlington signed him from Troyes AC. However midway through the following season his contract was terminated. His next spell in English football was with Exeter City where he spent two seasons and was part of the team who played against Manchester United in the FA Cup before being released at the tail end of the 2004-05 season. After a very brief spell with Bristol Rovers where he played just one game, he joined Hereford United.

In Jeannin's first season at Hereford he started 52 matches, missing only 5, and scored 3 goals in all competitions, one notably on his 28th birthday when he scored a free-kick against one of his former clubs Exeter City, a moment that was televised live. He became quickly a fans' favorite. However his second season with the Bulls was less successful. After being named Player of the Month for November, and scoring against Torquay United, he was suddenly dropped after the away match at Shrewsbury Town. Thereafter he was overlooked from the starting XI for all first team matches for the rest of the season, he did come on as a sub for the injured Mkandawire away at Wycombe Wanderers; although he was the only recognised defender on the bench. On 30 April 2007 it was announced that he had left Hereford by mutual consent.

Jeannin also managed to hit the crossbar when Hereford participated in Soccer AM's Crossbar Challenge.

In January 2008, he joined Kidderminster Harriers on loan for three months.

He joined Mansfield Town in August 2008 where he managed to play 31 games. He was released at the end of season after a new manager showed him the door.

He suffered a broken leg on trial at Truro City but he was back in action at the start of the 2010/2011 season.

In December 2011, Jeannin signed for Southern League side Weymouth.

Honours

As a player 
Exeter City
FA Devon St. Lukes Challenge Bowl (Incomplete) winner: 2003–04, 2004–05

Hereford United
Conference National Play-Off Final winner: 2005–06

References

External links

1977 births
Living people
French footballers
English Football League players
National League (English football) players
ES Troyes AC players
Darlington F.C. players
Racing Club de France Football players
Exeter City F.C. players
Bristol Rovers F.C. players
Hereford United F.C. players
Oxford United F.C. players
Kidderminster Harriers F.C. players
Weymouth F.C. players
Truro City F.C. players
Expatriate footballers in England
Association football defenders
Sportspeople from Troyes
Footballers from Grand Est
French expatriate footballers
French expatriate sportspeople in England
Ligue 2 players